The Beijing–Zhengzhou high-speed train are high-speed train services between Beijing and Zhengzhou, the capital of Henan Province. Most of the trains are operated by CR Zhengzhou while some are operated by CR Beijing and CR Nanchang.

History
The express train services between Beijing and Zhengzhou used to be the T-series train with train number T57/58 prior to the CRH era.

In 2007, the T57/58 service was cancelled with the introduction of the D-series trains on the Beijing–Guangzhou railway on 18 April. The D-series trains, operated with CRH2A (was later replaced by CRH5A) EMUs, shortened the travelling time to 4h 47m.

With the completion of the Beijing–Zhengzhou section of the Beijing–Guangzhou–Shenzhen–Hong Kong HSR, the D-series trains on the conventional railway stopped services on 21 December 2012 and was replaced by the faster G-series trains on the new high-speed railway, which was opened 5 days later, on 26 December 2012. At initial stage, 4 pairs of G-series trains were operated daily between Beijing West and Zhengzhou East with train numbers G89/90 and G561-566, and 1 pair of D-series train with train numbers D2021/2022.

On 28 December 2013, the timetables of the services were adjusted and a new pair of G-series trains (G559/560) between Beijing West and Zhengzhou East were added.

There were some major adjustments to the services on 1 July 2014. The only D-series train D2021/2022 was promoted to G-series with train number G563/560. Some trains had their train numbers changed: the former G560 was changed to G562, the former G562 ( → Beijing West) was changed to G564, the former G564 was changed to G566, the former G565 was extended from Zhengzhou East to Zhengzhou and was changed to G567, the former G567 was changed to G569, and the former G568 was changed to G570. The service between Beijing West and  also had the train numbers changed: the former G569/570 was changed to G429/430. This pair of train was later extended to Zhengzhou East on 10 January 2016.

On 16 April 2017, the G89/G90, G566 and G569/570 had their train numbers changed to G805/802, G806 and G807/808 respectively. These trains provide non-stop services between Beijing West and Zhengzhou East with a travelling time of 2h 25m.

Operations
They are the fastest trains between the two cities with a travelling time of less than 2h 30m. The G563/565/567/1563/1564 trains are services having more stops, with the travelling time varies from 3h 18m to 3h 31m.  

 ● : stop at the station
 ↓ or ↑ : pass the station
 —: out of service range
  : Benchmark train

Rolling stocks
The services are operated by CRH380A or CRH380AL trainsets.

CRH380A

The G806/561 and G807 services are operated by Zhengzhou-based 8-car CRH380A trainsets with the formation shown below.

The G1563/1564 service is operated by Nanchang-based double-headed 8-car CRH380A trainsets (16-car) with the formation shown below. This service uses the same trainset with the G487/488 train.

CRH380AL
The G805, G802/567, G565/808 and G563 services are operated by Zhengzhou-based 16-car CRH380AL trainsets with the formation shown below. The front and rear cars (Car 1 and 16) are for business seats together with 2+2 first class seats. Car 2-3 are first class car with 2+2 seating. Car 4-8 and 10-15 are for second class seats with 3+2 seating. Car 9 is the dining car.

Other services

Beside the services mentioned above, the high-speed train services between Beijing and most cities in central, south and west China, including Wuhan, Guangzhou, Shenzhen, Hong Kong, Xi'an, Chengdu, Chongqing, Lanzhou, Nanchang, etc., also provide high-speed train connection between Beijing and Zhengzhou.

References

China Railway passenger services
Passenger rail transport in China
Railway services introduced in 2012